The men's 400 metre freestyle event at the 1964 Olympic Games took place between October 14 and 15. This swimming event used freestyle swimming, which means that the method of the stroke is not regulated (unlike backstroke, breaststroke, and butterfly events). Nearly all swimmers use the front crawl or a variant of that stroke. Because an Olympic size swimming pool is 50 metres long, this race consisted of eight lengths of the pool.

Medalists

Results

Heats

Seven heats were held; the fastest eight swimmers advanced to the Finals.  Those that advanced are highlighted.

Heat One

Heat Two

Heat Three

Heat Four

Heat Five

Heat Six

Heat Seven

Final

Key: WR = World record

References

Men's 400 Metre Freestyle
Men's events at the 1964 Summer Olympics